Bradley Gardens is an unincorporated community and census-designated place (CDP) located within Bridgewater Township, in Somerset County, New Jersey, United States. As of the 2010 United States Census, the CDP's population was 14,206.

Geography
According to the United States Census Bureau, Bradley Gardens had a total area of 4.616 square miles (11.955 km2), including 4.487 square miles (11.620 km2) of land and 0.129 square miles (0.335 km2) of water (2.80%).

Demographics

Census 2010

References

Bridgewater Township, New Jersey
Census-designated places in Somerset County, New Jersey